Dylan Zink is an American ice hockey executive and former defenseman. He was an All-American for Massachusetts Lowell.

Playing career
Zink's college career began in 2013 when he debuted for the ice hockey team at the University of Massachusetts Lowell. His first season was rather unimpressive, scoring just a single point in 26 games, but he did help the team capture the Hockey East Tournament. Zink found his game as a sophomore and led the team's defense in scoring, retaining that honor for the remainder of his time with the River Hawks. After helping the team return to the NCAA Tournament as a junior, Zink had his best offensive season in 2017 and was named an All-American. He led the team to a first place finish as well as its third Hockey East championship.

Zink signed with the Wilkes-Barre/Scranton Penguins after Lowell was eliminated and he finished out the year in the AHL. In his first full season as a professional, Zink started in Wilkes-Barre but was demoted to the ECHL after just 7 appearances. He found much greater success with the Wheeling Nailers, averaging nearly a point every other game, but decided to head to Europe after the season. He played well in a top Norwegian league but his production suffered when he moved over to the second Swedish league, HockeyAllsvenskan. After just 20 games, Zink returned to the ECHL and finished out the season before retiring as a player.

In 2020, Zink returned to his alma mater as the Director of Hockey Operations, a position he continues to hold as of 2021.

Career statistics

Regular season and playoffs

Awards and honors

References

External links

1992 births
Living people
American men's ice hockey defensemen
Ice hockey people from Wisconsin
Sportspeople from Madison, Wisconsin
AHCA Division I men's ice hockey All-Americans
UMass Lowell River Hawks men's ice hockey players
Wilkes-Barre/Scranton Penguins players
Wheeling Nailers players
Sparta Warriors players
Karlskrona HK players
South Carolina Stingrays players
Toledo Walleye players